Bruna Ferraz (born  5 September 1981) is a Brazilian adult model, pornographic actress  and TV-personality.

Life and career 
Born in Porto Alegre, Ferraz moved in São Paulo in 2005, with the goal to build a career as a stripper.  She became first known as Internet personality thanks to her webcam sexy-shows. In 2007 she entered the adult industry signing an exclusive contract with the company Brasileirinhas; the same year she starred her first film, A Garota da Web Sex.

In addition to adult videos, Ferraz was also a cast-member of SBT TV-show  Sem Controle and of the RedeTV! late night TV-show Eu Vi na TV hosted by João Kléber. She also co-hosted, alongside the actresses Leila Lopes and Pâmela Butt, the talk show Calcinha Justa in the Pay TV Sexprivé Brasileirinhas.

In 2012, Ferraz paraded with the Samba School "Unidos de Vila Maria" in the Carnival of São Paulo.

References

External links

Brazilian female adult models
Brazilian pornographic film actresses
1981 births
Living people
Brazilian actresses
People from Porto Alegre